The 1901 VFL season was the Geelong Football Club's fifth season in the Victorian Football League and its first with Henry Young as captain.

Geelong finished the home and away with 14 wins and 3 losses, finishing in first position, winning the minor premiership. Due to Geelong's great record in the home and away season, Geelong were displeased that the minor premier has the same chance of winning the major premiership as the other finalists. As such, the first Argus system was revoked after only one season.

The leading goalkicker was Charlie Coles with 24 goals.

Playing List 
3 players played all 18 games this season, with a total of 33 players being used. One player reached the 50 game milestone, Teddy Rankin.

Statistics

Season summary

Results

Ladder

References

 Geelong Football Club seasons
 1901 in Australian rules football